Dolichognatha longiceps is a species of spider in the family Tetragnathidae, found in India, Myanmar and Thailand. In 2014, it was suggested that the species be transferred back to the genus Prolochus, where it was placed by Tamerlan Thorell in 1895, but , this has not been accepted by secondary sources, such as the World Spider Catalog.

References

Tetragnathidae
Spiders of Asia
Spiders described in 1895